Roswell A. Parmenter (September 20, 1821 – February 1, 1904) was an American lawyer and politician from New York.

Life
Roswell A. Parmenter was born in Pittstown, New York, on September 20, 1821, the son of Dr. Azel Fiske Parmenter (born 1786) and Lavina (Ray) Parmenter. He studied law, was admitted to the bar, and practiced in Troy.

He was City Attorney of Troy from 1853 to 1854, and from 1871 to 1883.

He was a member of the New York State Senate (12th D.) in 1874 and 1875.

At the New York state election, 1881, he ran on the Democratic ticket for New York Attorney General, but was defeated by Republican Leslie W. Russell.

Parmenter was Corporation Counsel of Troy from 1886 to 1890.

He died in Troy on February 1, 1904, at age 82.

Sources

 Life Sketches of Government Officers and Members of the Legislature of the State of New York in 1875 by W. H. McElroy and Alexander McBride (pg. 93ff) [e-book]
 Courts and Lawyers of New York: A History, 1609-1925 by Alden Chester & Edwin Melvin Williams (Vol. I; pg. 1065)

1821 births
1904 deaths
Democratic Party New York (state) state senators
Politicians from Troy, New York
Missing middle or first names
People from Pittstown, New York
19th-century American politicians